Senator Palmer may refer to:

Members of the United States Senate
John M. Palmer (politician) (1817–1900), U.S. Senator from Illinois from 1891 to 1897
Thomas W. Palmer (1830–1913), U.S. Senator from Michigan from 1883 to 1889
William A. Palmer (1781–1860), U.S. Senator from Vermont from 1818 to 1825
David Palmer (24 character), fictional U.S. Senator in the television series 24

United States state senate members
Abiah W. Palmer (1835–1881), New York State Senate
Abraham J. Palmer (1847–1922), New York State Senate
Albert Palmer (American politician) (1831–1887), Massachusetts State Senate
Alice Palmer (politician) (born 1939), Illinois State Senate
Andrew Palmer (politician) (1808–1891), Wisconsin State Senate
George W. Palmer (Virginia politician) (1894–1972), Virginia State Senate
Harry J. Palmer (1872–1948), New York State Senate
Henry L. Palmer (1819–1909), Wisconsin State Senate
Joel Palmer (1810–1881), Oregon State Senate
Linwood E. Palmer Jr. (1921–2008), Maine State Senate
R. J. Palmer (born 1970), Kentucky State Senate
Richard F. Palmer (1930–2018), Minnesota State Senate
William D. Palmer (born 1935), Iowa State Senate